Patrick Joseph McGrath (pronounced  ; born June 11, 1945) is an Irish-born American prelate of the Roman Catholic Church. He served as bishop of the Diocese of San Jose in California from 1999 to 2019 and as an auxiliary bishop of the Archdiocese of San Francisco from 1988 to 1998.

Biography

Early life
Patrick McGrath was born in Dublin, Ireland, on June 11, 1945. He is the youngest of three sons of Patrick Joseph McGrath, Sr., and Eileen Gaule McGrath. For secondary school, Patrick McGrath attended Chanel College in Dublin. In 1964, at age 19, McGrath entered St. John's Seminary in Waterford, Ireland. His father died while he was in seminary.

Priesthood 
In 1970, McGrath was ordained to the priesthood in Waterford by Michael Russell (bishop of Waterford and Lismore) for service in the Archdiocese of San Francisco. McGrath moved to San Francisco, where he was assigned as parochial vicar of St. Anne of the Sunset Parish and as a member of the archdiocesan tribunal. 

In 1974, he was sent to Rome to continue his education, earning a Doctor of Canon Law degree from the Pontifical Lateran University on June 11, 1977. After returning to San Francisco. McGrath was appointed the vice-dfficialis, then officialis, of the archdiocesan tribunal. In 1986, he became pastor, then rector of the Cathedral of St. Mary of the Assumption Parish in San Francisco.

Auxiliary Bishop of San Francisco
Pope Paul II appointed McGrath as an auxiliary bishop of the Archdiocese of San Francisco and titular bishop of Allegheny on December 6, 1988.  He was consecrated on January 25, 1989, at the Cathedral of Saint Mary of the Assumption in San Francisco.  Archbishop Quinn served as his principal consecrator.

Bishop of San Jose 
John Paul II named McGrath as coadjutor bishop of the Diocese of San Jose on June 30, 1998. When Bishop Pierre DuMaine retired on November 27, 1999,  McGrath automatically succeeded him.

On August 23, 2018, the diocese, with McGrath's approval, paid US$2.3 million for a 3,269 square foot, five-bedroom home in Silicon Valley to serve as McGrath's retirement residence.  McGrath explained that the money for house came from a fund that was dedicated only for housing expenses for retired bishops However, facing criticism about the purchase, McGrath said a day later that the parish would sell the house and he would eventually retire in a parish rectory instead.

On October 23, 2018, McGrath released a list of 15 priests with credible allegations of sexual abuse against minors.  As part of the investigative process, McGrath held several listening session with individuals impacted by the alleged crimes.

Retirement 
Having reached the mandatory retirement age of 75 for bishops, McGrath submitted his letter of resignation as bishop of the Diocese of San Jose to Pope Francis.  The pope accepted it on May 1, 2019.

See also
 

 Catholic Church hierarchy
 Catholic Church in the United States
 Historical list of the Catholic bishops of the United States
 List of Catholic bishops of the United States
 Lists of patriarchs, archbishops, and bishops

References

External links
Roman Catholic Diocese of San Jose Official Site
Diocese of San Jose biography
Twitter Handle @BishopMcGrath (Bishop P.J. McGrath)
Catholic-Hierarchy.net data

Episcopal succession

   

   

Irish emigrants to the United States
Irish expatriate Catholic bishops
21st-century Roman Catholic bishops in the United States
Roman Catholic bishops of San Jose in California
People from County Dublin
People from San Jose, California
1945 births
Living people
Pontifical Lateran University alumni
People educated at Chanel College, Dublin